Capri is an Italian TV series produced by Rai Fiction. The story involves a young woman from Milan, Vittoria Mari (played by Gabriella Pession), who discovers, one month before she is to be married, that she has been named as a beneficiary in the will of a woman she has never met. She travels to the island of Capri to find out why, becomes entwined in the lives of the people she meets, and learns something shocking about her past. The two other main characters in the drama are brothers Massimo (played by Kaspar Capparoni) and Umberto (played by Sergio Assisi).

References 

Rai. (2013). Capri TV series. Retrieved from http://www.capri.rai.it/dl/portali/site/articolo/ContentItem-02fd2394-0f7c-4ce3-b8b5-94f8c2f21d01.html?homepage#sthash.q41y6YDW.dpuf

RAI original programming
2006 Italian television series debuts
2010 Italian television series endings
2000s Italian drama television series
2010s Italian drama television series